Nōgaku (能楽) is one of the traditional styles of Japanese theater. It is composed of the lyric drama noh, and the comic theater kyōgen (狂言). Traditionally, both types of theatre are performed together, the kyōgen being interposed between the pieces of noh during a day of performances.

It has influenced the Bunraku, or Japanese puppet theatre as well as Kabuki.

Nōgaku theatre was inscribed in 2008 by UNESCO on the List of Masterpieces of the Oral and Intangible Heritage of Humanity.

References

External links 
 About Nohgaku THE NOHGAKU PERFORMERS' ASSOCIATION
 THE NOHGAKU PERFORMERS' ASSOCIATION THE NOHGAKU PERFORMERS' ASSOCIATION

Masterpieces of the Oral and Intangible Heritage of Humanity
Dances of Japan
History of theatre
Japanese styles of music
Japanese traditional music
Theatre in Japan